René Pucher (born 2 December 1970) is a Slovak ice hockey player. He competed in the men's tournament at the 1994 Winter Olympics.

Career statistics

Regular season and playoffs

International

References

1970 births
Living people
Olympic ice hockey players of Slovakia
Ice hockey players at the 1994 Winter Olympics
Sportspeople from Prešov
Slovak ice hockey centres
Czechoslovak ice hockey centres
Slovak expatriate ice hockey players in the Czech Republic
Slovak expatriate ice hockey players in Switzerland